The 1986 Kilkenny Senior Hurling Championship was the 92nd staging of the Kilkenny Senior Hurling Championship since its establishment by the Kilkenny County Board.

Ballyhale Shamrocks were the defending champions.

Clara won the championship after a 3-10 to 4-05 defeat of Ballyhale Shamrocks in the final. It was their first ever championship title.

References

Kilkenny Senior Hurling Championship
Kilkenny Senior Hurling Championship